The New York University Law Review is a bimonthly general law review covering legal scholarship in all areas, including legal theory and policy, environmental law, legal history, and international law. The journal was established in 1924 as a collaborative effort between law students and members of the local bar. Its first editor-in-chief was Paul D. Kaufman. Between 1924 and 1950, it was variously known as the Annual Review of the Law School of New York University, the New York University Law Quarterly Review, and the New York University Law Review, before obtaining its current name in 1950.

Selection
Each year, the journal selects 52 new members from a class of approximately 450. Members are selected using a competitive process, which takes into account an applicant's first-year grades, performance in a writing competition, and potential to contribute to diversity on the journal.

Abstracting and indexing
The journal is abstracted and indexed in:

According to the Journal Citation Reports, the journal has a 2021 impact factor of 2.427.

Lawsuit over discrimination against white males
On October 6, 2018, a group called "Faculty, Alumni, and Students Opposed to Racial Preferences" filed a lawsuit in the United States District Court for the Southern District of New York against the review over discrimination against white males in selecting staff editors and articles to publish. The challengers lost at trial  and again on appeal to the United States Court of Appeals for the Second Circuit. The Supreme Court of the United States declined to review the case.

Alumni
Prominent alumni of the New York University Law Review include:

 Hakeem Jeffries, Minority Leader of the 118th Congress
 Phil Weiser, 39th Attorney General of Colorado
 Rudy Giuliani, 107th Mayor of New York City
 Evan Chesler, former chairman of Cravath, Swaine & Moore
 Martin Lipton, co-founder of Wachtell, Lipton, Rosen & Katz,
 Leonard Rosen, co-founder of Wachtell, Lipton, Rosen & Katz
 Herbert Wachtell, co-founder of Wachtell, Lipton, Rosen & Katz
 George Katz, co-founder of Wachtell, Lipton, Rosen & Katz

Notable articles
The journal has published the following notable articles: 
 Karl N. Llewellyn, Through Title to Contract and a Bit Beyond, 15 N.Y.U. L.Q. Rev. 159 (1938)
 Hugo L. Black, The Bill of Rights, 35 N.Y.U. L. Rev. 865 (1960)
 Earl Warren, The Bill of Rights and the Military, 37 N.Y.U. L. Rev. 181 (1962)
 Clyde W. Summers, Individual Rights in Collective Agreements and Arbitration, 37 N.Y.U. L. Rev. 362 (1962)
 Henry J. Friendly, In Praise of Erie--And of the New Federal Common Law, 39 N.Y.U. L. Rev. 383 (1964)
 Robert A. Leflar, Choice-Influencing Considerations in Conflict Law, 41 N.Y.U. L. Rev. 267 (1966)
 Anthony G. Amsterdam, The Supreme Court and the Rights of Suspects in Criminal Cases, 45 N.Y.U. L. Rev. 785 (1970)
 Ronald Dworkin, The Forum of Principle, 56 N.Y.U. L. Rev. 469 (1981)
 William J. Brennan, Jr., The Bill of Rights and the States: The Revival of State Constitutions as Guardians of Individual Rights, 61 N.Y.U. L. Rev. 535 (1986)
 Richard L. Revesz, Rehabilitating Interstate Competition: Rethinking the 'Race-to-the-Bottom' Rationale for Federal Environmental Regulation, 67 N.Y.U. L. Rev. 1210 (1992)
 Russell G. Pearce, The Professionalism Paradigm Shift: Why Discarding Professional Ideology Will Improve the Conduct and Reputation of the Bar, 70 N.Y.U. L. Rev. 1229 (1995)
 Yochai Benkler, Free as the Air to Common Use: First Amendment Constraints on Enclosure of the Public Domain, 74 L. Rev. 354 (1999)
 Jon D. Hanson & Douglas A. Kysar, Taking Behavioralism Seriously: The Problem of Market Manipulation, 74 N.Y.U. L. Rev. 630 (1999)
 Jody Freeman, The Private Role in Public Governance, 75 N.Y.U. L. Rev. 543 (2000)
 Stephen Breyer, Our Democratic Constitution, 77 N.Y.U. L. Rev. 245 (2002)
 Lisa Schultz Bressman, Beyond Accountability: Arbitrariness and Legitimacy in the Administrative State, 78 N.Y.U. L. Rev. 461 (2003)
 Jack M. Balkin, Digital Speech and Democratic Culture: A Theory of Freedom of Expression for the Information Society, 79 N.Y.U. L. Rev. 1 (2004)
 Richard A. Nagareda, Class Certification in the Age of Aggregate Proof, 84 N.Y.U. L. Rev. 97 (2009)
 Arthur R. Miller, Simplified Pleading, Meaningful Days in Court, and Trials on the Merits: Reflections on the Deformation of Federal Procedure, 88 N.Y.U. L. Rev. 286 (2013)

References

External links

American law journals
General law journals
New York University academic journals
Bimonthly journals
New York University School of Law
English-language journals
Law journals edited by students
Publications established in 1924
1924 establishments in New York City